Anne-Marie Escoffier (born 15 August 1942 in Dax, Landes) is a French politician and a former member of the Senate of France. She represented the Aveyron department as a member of the Radical Party of the Left.

References
Page on the Senate website
http://www.senat.fr/listes/senatl.html

1942 births
Living people
People from Dax, Landes
Politicians from Nouvelle-Aquitaine
Radical Party of the Left politicians
Government ministers of France
French Senators of the Fifth Republic
Women members of the Senate (France)
Women government ministers of France
21st-century French women politicians
Senators of Aveyron